Henri Huchard (4 April 1844 – 1 December 1910) was a French neurologist and cardiologist born in Auxon, Aube.

He studied medicine at the University of Paris, later being appointed médecin des hôpitaux. During his career he was associated with the Bichat and Necker hospitals in Paris. Huchard was a member of the Académie de Médecine.

Huchard specialized in the study of cardiovascular disease, and is remembered for his research of arteriosclerosis. His name is lent to "Huchard's disease" (continued arterial hypertension), and to "Huchard's sign", which is an indication of hypertension, and defined as a pulse rate that does not decrease when changing from a standing to a supine position.

Huchard married Berthe Gilbert with whom he had two sons.

Selected publications 
 La myocardite varioleuse (1870–71), with Louis Desnos
 Traité des névroses (1883) second edition,  with Alexandre Axenfeld (1825–1876) 
 Traité des maladies du coeur et des vaisscaux (1889)
 Consultations médicales (1901)
 Les maladies du coeur et leur traitement (1908)

References

Further reading
 Pagel: Biographical Dictionary, translated biography
 Biografias y Vidas (Biography translated from Spanish)

French cardiologists
French neurologists
People from Aube
1844 births
1910 deaths
Members of the Ligue de la patrie française